Mehmet Umut Nayir (born 28 June 1993) is a Turkish professional footballer who plays as a striker for Ümraniyespor on loan from Eyüpspor.

Career
Nayir is a youth product of Albayrak and Ankaragücü. In October 2012, he signed his first professional contract with Ankaragücü. On 30 January 2015, he transferred to Osmanlıspor in the Süper Lig. He made his professional debut for Osmanlıspor in a 1–1 Süper Lig tie with Kayserispor on 16 August 2015, scoring his side's only goal in his debut. On 16 June 2016, he moved to Yeni Malatyaspor on loan. Shortly after he joined Göztepe on loan for the 2016-17 season. He went on another loan the following season to Ankaragücü.

Nayir moved to Beşiktaş in July of 2018. A few weeks after signing he moved to Bursaspor on loan for the 2018-19 season. The following season, he returned to Beşiktaş where he started making appearances. For the 2020-21 season, he joined the Croatian club Hajduk Split on loan.

Nayir then transferred to Giresunspor in 2021, but was released at the end of the 2021-22 season after a public spat over wages. He transferred to Eyüpspor in the summer of 2022 on a 2-year contract, and immediately went out on loan with Ümraniyespor in the Süper Lig for the 2022-23 season.

International career
Nayir represented the Turkey U23s in their winning campaign at the 2021 Islamic Solidarity Games.

Personal life
Outside of football, Nayir graduated with a law degree from the Ankara University, Law School. He married his wife Enfal Diner in September 2021.

Honours
Turkey U23
Islamic Solidarity Games: 2021

References

External links
 
 
 

1993 births
Living people
People from Kocasinan
Turkish footballers
Turkey youth international footballers
Turkish people of Circassian descent
Association football forwards
MKE Ankaragücü footballers
Ankaraspor footballers
Göztepe S.K. footballers
Yeni Malatyaspor footballers
Bursaspor footballers
Beşiktaş J.K. footballers
HNK Hajduk Split players
Giresunspor footballers
TFF First League players
Süper Lig players
Croatian Football League players
Turkish expatriate footballers
Turkish expatriates in Croatia
Expatriate footballers in Croatia
Ankara University alumni